Tarascon is a commune in Bouches-du-Rhône department, France.

Tarascon may also refer to:

People 
 Jean-Marie Tarascon (born 1953), French chemist
 Paul Tarascon (1882–1977), French World War I flying ace

Places 
 Canton of Tarascon, a former canton of Bouches-du-Rhône department, France
 Tarascon-sur-Ariège, a commune in Ariège department, France

Other uses 
 Tarascon (horse), a racehorse

See also 
 Tarasque (disambiguation)